Emotions is the debut studio album by alaska!.  It was released February 4, 2003, on b-girl records.

Track listing
 "The Western Shore" - 4:30
 "Love (To Be Your Main)" - 4:24
 "Sun Don't Shine" - 4:01
 "Broken" - 4:52
 "S.S./Candycane" - 2:46
 "S.S./Candycane (Continued)" - 1:40
 "Rust and Cyanide" - 6:11
 "Lost the Gold" - 3:44
 "Resistance" - 3:53
 "Nightmare X" - 4:00
 "In My Time" - 5:23

References

2003 debut albums
Alaska! albums